Robert William Grupp (born May 8, 1955) is a former American football punter who played for three seasons in the National Football League (NFL). Grupp was chosen for the Pro Bowl after the 1979 season as a member of the Kansas City Chiefs.

Biography
Prior to his career in professional football, Grupp was a star quarterback at Neshaminy High School in Langhorne, PA. He also punted and was an all-Atlantic Coast Conference (ACC) cornerback at Duke University (class of 1977) where he also lettered as an outfielder on the baseball team during his junior and senior years. He was MVP of the 1977 Duke baseball team.

In 1984, he played with the New Jersey Generals of the United States Football League (USFL).

References

1955 births
Living people
American football cornerbacks
American football punters
Baseball outfielders
Duke Blue Devils baseball players
Duke Blue Devils football players
Kansas City Chiefs players
New Jersey Generals players
American Conference Pro Bowl players
Players of American football from Philadelphia
Baseball players from Philadelphia